Ascot Park railway station is located on the Seaford line. Situated in the south-western Adelaide suburb of Ascot Park, it is 10.2 kilometres from Adelaide station.

History
Ascot Park was opened on 6 April 1914. When the Hallett Cove line was duplicated in 1955, the single platform was converted to an island platform. As part of a grade separation project to eliminate the Daws Road and Marion Road level crossings, the station was demolished and rebuilt, reopening in March 1974. The station shelters were replaced in 2014 when the line was electrified and extended to Seaford.

The station is located just south of where the Flinders line branches off. The station has two tracks, either side of an island platform with a pedestrian subway connecting the platform to the two adjacent streets.

Services by platform

References

External links

Railway stations in Adelaide
Railway stations in Australia opened in 1914